The St. Francis River Bridge, also known as the Lake City Bridge, was a historic bridge spanning the St. Francis River at Lake City, Arkansas. The bridge was designed and built in 1934 by the Vincennes Bridge Company, and carried Arkansas Highway 18 until 1998, when a modern 4-span I-beam bridge was built adjacent to it. The old bridge was dismantled, leaving only the vertical lift segment on the east bank of the river.

The bridge was listed on the National Register of Historic Places in 1990.

See also
List of bridges documented by the Historic American Engineering Record in Arkansas
List of bridges on the National Register of Historic Places in Arkansas
National Register of Historic Places listings in Craighead County, Arkansas

References

External links

Historic American Engineering Record in Arkansas
Road bridges on the National Register of Historic Places in Arkansas
Bridges completed in 1934
National Register of Historic Places in Craighead County, Arkansas
Trestle bridges in the United States
1934 establishments in Arkansas
Transportation in Craighead County, Arkansas
Vertical lift bridges in the United States